Bijao is a common name for several plants and may refer to:

Calathea lutea
Heliconia bihai